Saidabad-e Sofla or Saidabad-e Pain (Persian: سعيدابادپائین), both meaning "Lower Saidabad", may refer to:
 Saidabad-e Sofla, Kerman
 Saidabad-e Sofla, Zanjan